Aliganj  is a town and a municipal board in Etah district in the state of Uttar Pradesh, India. Mahfooz ali khan former agriculture chairman of India and former member of parliament of India belonged to the city. Official name of Aliganj is Pargana Azamnagar. Aliganj is the 2nd largest residential area in Lucknow after Indira Nagar.

Geography
It has an average elevation of 154 metres (505 ft).
The nearest city to Aliganj are Sarai aghat, Etah, Khair, Kaimganj, jaithra, dhumari, kampil, Amoghpur Bhrahmanan, Farrukhabad, Aligarh.

Demographics
As of 2011 India census, Aliganj had a population of 28396. Males constitute 53% of the population and females 47%. Aliganj has an average literacy rate of 72%, lower than the national average of 59.5%; with 60% of the males and 40% of females literate. 15% of the population is under 8 years of age.

Famous For 
Aliganj is famous for plums that's why famously known as City of Plums. Lucknow city Railway Station is 6Km away from Aliganj. Badshahnagar Railway station is about 4km from Aliganj. Chaudhary Charan Singh International Airport is 20km away from Aliganj.

Villages
 

Daheliya Pooth

References

Cities and towns in Etah district